Tao-Klarjeti is a Georgian historical and cultural region in north-eastern Turkey.  The region is based around two river basins - Chorokhi and Kura (Mtkvari), and also partially includes the upper source of the Aras river. In modern usage it most often denotes the territory that was administrated or claimed by Georgian Democratic Republic but is nowadays part of Turkey due to the Soviet-Turkish deal in 1921.

The term "Tao-Klarjeti" is based on the names of two most important provinces of the region — Tao and Klarjeti. The term is equivalent to “Zemo Kartli” (i.e., Upper Kartli or Upper Iberia) and is also a synonym for historical Meskheti.

Cultural and historical heritage
Many important Georgian cultural monuments from the middle ages are located on the territory of Tao-Klarjeti and many of them are preserved as ruins. Several monuments of medieval Georgian architecture – abandoned or converted churches, monasteries, bridges and castles – are scattered across the area.

Best known are the monasteries of Khandzta, Khakhuli, Ancha, the churches of Oshki, Ishkhani, Bana, Parkhali, Doliskana, Otkhta Eklesia, Opiza, Parekhi and Tbeti.

Gallery

References 

 "Tao-Klarjeti". (2006) Valeri Silogava and Kakha Shengelia. Caucasian University Press, Tbilisi. 

Historical regions of Georgia (country)
Tao-Klarjeti
Bagratid Iberia
Historical regions